The 2020 Okolo Slovenska was a five-stage men's professional road cycling race. The race was the 64th edition of the Okolo Slovenska. It was rated as a 2.1 event as part of the 2020 UCI Europe Tour. The race started in Žilina on 16 September and finished on 19 September in Skalica.

Route

Teams
Eighteen teams, consisting of five UCI WorldTeams, six UCI ProTeams, six UCI Continental teams, and the Slovakian national team, participated in the race. , with five riders, was the only team that did not enter six riders into the race. 107 of the 125 riders in the race finished.

UCI WorldTeams

 
 
 
 
 

UCI ProTeams

 
 
 
 
 
 

UCI Continental Teams

 
 
 
 
 
 

National Teams

 Slovakia

Stages

Stage 1a 
16 September 2020 — Žilina to Žilina,

Stage 1b 
16 September 2020 — Žilina,  (ITT)

Stage 2 
17 September 2020 — Žilina to Banská Bystrica,

Stage 3 
18 September 2020 — Banská Bystrica to Žiar nad Hronom,

Stage 4 
19 September 2020 — Topoľčianky to Skalica,

Classification leadership table

Final classification standings

General classification

Points classification

Mountains classification

Young rider classification

Slovakian rider classification

Team classification

See also

 2020 in men's road cycling
 2020 in sports

References

Sources

External links

2020
Okolo Slovenska
Okolo Slovenska
Okolo Slovenska